Don Bosco High School is a private, Roman Catholic high school in Gilbertville, Iowa, United States.   It is located in the Roman Catholic Archdiocese of Dubuque.

History
Don Bosco Central High School, in partnership with the students, parents, and community, will provide a challenging environment to develop intellectual, social, physical, and creative abilities while fostering spiritual and emotional growth so that all students can successfully meet the demands of a changing global society." Although this mission statement was crafted and implemented at Don Bosco several years ago, its spirit has been present throughout the school's history.

The planning for a new high school first began in 1955 with the appointment of Rev. Wilbur W. Ziegler as administrator of Immaculate Conception parish in Gilbertville. Archbishop Leo Binz requested that Rev. Ziegler work with local parishes to improve the quality of Catholic education in the area. On December 8, 1955, only two days after his arrival, Rev. Ziegler assured parishioners that he would do all he could to assist in building a high school that would satisfy the educational and spiritual needs of the parishes' students. 

The first meeting to discuss a new high school was held on February 7, 1956. Pastors from St. Athanasius - Jesup, St. Francis - Barclay, St. Joseph's - Raymond, St. Mary's - Eagle Center, Sacred Heart - La Porte City, and Immaculate Conception - Gilbertville were present. These pastors successfully petitioned for the organization and construction of a Catholic central high school. With the archbishop's approval, Gilbertville was officially chosen as the location for the school and Rev. Donald F. Sweeney was appointed executive coordinator for the new high school.

Building began in July 1956 on a strip of land donated and cleared by Immaculate Conception parish. About eight hundred trees were felled that summer and 65,000 cubic yards of dirt were hauled to prepare the land for the athletic field and building site. The building itself was contracted to cost no more than $145,865 with each of the six parishes contributing toward the cost.

Registration for the first year of Don Bosco High School took place August 26–28, 1956. After careful preparations by Rev. Sweeney, Sr. Mary Angela Shier, principal, and three other School Sister of Notre Dame from Mankato, Minnesota, the school year began September 4, 1956 with 170 students. In celebration of the new year and the new school, a Votive Mass was offered in honor of the Holy Spirit by Monsignor Cremer.

With the support of the local parishes as well as generous individuals, building improvements have continued at Don Bosco. In 1957, the auditorium-gymnasium was added to the building. A twenty-five room addition was built in 1964 providing new areas for a library, science labs, band, home economics, and additional classrooms. With the generous assistance of alumni, a wrestling room and, more recently, technology labs have been added. Substantial community involvement in the "For a Brighter Future" development fund, begun in 1990, has also contributed to many of the school's improvements.

Since its foundation, nearly 3,000 students have benefited from the challenging environment of Don Bosco High School. Enrollment has varied from 161 students to 406 students over the school's history; 223 students are enrolled in the 1999-2000 school year. Don Bosco provides a sound academic program which includes emphasis on Catholic teachings within an atmosphere of Christian living. Accredited by the State of Iowa, Don Bosco offers its students a full range of courses in business education, general education, and college preparatory. Extra-curricular opportunities have adapted to meet students' changing interests and needs, including dramatics, speech, music ministry, band, concert choir, student council, sports, publications, photography, Shakespeare after Hours, and National Honor Society. Don Bosco has continued to be a joint venture in sharing, in which students, parents, Church, and community provide an opportunity for growth for all students.

Athletics
Don Bosco has won 28 state titles (as of the end of the 2019-2020 school year):  22 in wrestling, 4 in football, and 2 in baseball.

Fall Sports
Cross Country 
Football - Program started in 2004.
 State Champions - 2013, 2016, 2017, 2019 
Volleyball
Cheerleading
Winter Sports
Boys Basketball
Girls Basketball
Wrestling
 Traditional State Champions - 1979, 1981, 1985, 1987, 2006, 2007, 2008, 2009, 2010, 2012, 2019, 2020
 State Dual-meet Champions - 1995, 2002, 2005, 2006, 2007, 2008, 2009, 2010, 2018, 2019, 2023
Dance Team
Cheerleading
Spring Sports
Golf
Track & Field
Summer Sports
Baseball
 State Champions - 1978, 2020 
Softball

See also
List of school districts in Iowa
List of high schools in Iowa

Notes and references

External links
 School Website

Schools in Black Hawk County, Iowa
Catholic secondary schools in Iowa
Private high schools in Iowa
Educational institutions established in 1956
1956 establishments in Iowa